Kallima limborgii, the Peninsular Malaya leaf butterfly, is a butterfly of the family Nymphalidae. It is found in Malaysia, Thailand and southern Burma.

The larvae feed on Strobilanthes callosus and Pseuderanthemum malabaricum.

Subspecies
Kallima limborgii limborgii – (Thailand, southern Burma)
Kallima limborgii amplirufa Fruhstorfer, 1898 – Leaf butterfly (Peninsular Malaya)

References

Kallimini
Taxa named by Frederic Moore
Butterflies described in 1879
Butterflies of Asia